Yersiniops sophronicus, common name Yersin's ground mantis, is a species of praying mantis native to North America.

See also
List of mantis genera and species

References

Mantidae
Mantodea of North America
Insects described in 1908